is a railway station in the city of Aizuwakamatsu, in Fukushima Prefecture, Japan. It is the main station for Aizu-Wakamatsu and surrounding areas. The station also has a freight terminal operated by Japan Freight Railway Company (JR Freight).

Lines
It is also the terminal station from the JR East Tadami Line.

Station layout
In the forecourt of the station there is a bus terminal, taxi rank and car park. The station building, located on the eastern side of the tracks, contains a gift shop (including bento and souvenirs), travel agency (View Plaza), and Midori no Madoguchi staffed ticket office. Aizu-Wakamatsu Station has five platforms. Platform 1 and 2 are bay platforms. Platform 1 is immediately inside the ticket gate and most trains to Koriyama depart from here. Moving westward there is a storage track then platforms 2 and 3. The tracks at platform 1 and 2 are a dead end and an overhead walkway at the end connects platforms 2/3 to platform 1 and the rest of the station. Platforms 4 and 5 are accessed via a footbridge.

Platforms

History
On May 21, 1917, the station was renamed Aizu-Wakamatsu. The station was absorbed into the JR East network upon the privatization of the Japanese National Railways (JNR) on April 1, 1987.

Passenger statistics
In fiscal 2017, the JR portion of the station was used by an average of 2669 passengers daily (boarding passengers only). The passenger figures for previous years are as shown below.

Webcam
There was a webcam installed by NTT East on the walkway between platforms 1 and 2/3. This gave a view of trains using platforms 1 and 2. The camera provided both video and sound using a 512 kbit/s stream.  The webcam was discontinued as of March 31, 2017.

Surrounding area
 Aizuwakamatsu Fire Station
 Aizu Bus Ekimae Terminal

Bus terminal

Station Square

Route buses

in front of the Station Bus stop

Route buses

Highway buses

Eki-mae Happy Parking　Bus stop

See also
 List of railway stations in Japan

References

External links

 JR East Station information 

Stations of East Japan Railway Company
Stations of Japan Freight Railway Company
Railway stations in Fukushima Prefecture
Aizu Line
Ban'etsu West Line
Tadami Line
Railway stations in Japan opened in 1899
Aizuwakamatsu